The 1892 San Jose State Spartans football team represented State Teachers College at San Jose during the 1892 college football season.  In their first year fielding an American football team, the Spartans lost in their sole contest against the local YMCA team of San Jose.  The game technically occurred during 1893, but it represented the 1892 academic year and so that is the season it is counted.

Schedule

References

San Jose State
San Jose State Spartans football seasons
College football winless seasons
San Jose State Spartans football